Sir John Eardley Eardley-Wilmot, 2nd Baronet (16 November 1810 – 1 February 1892) was a politician and judge in the United Kingdom. He was Member of Parliament (MP) for South Warwickshire from 1874 to 1885.

Career
Sir John E. Eardley-Wilmot wrote a number of works, including a work in Latin in 1829, and in 1853, an update of his father's Abridgement of Blackstone's Commentaries on the Laws of England. He also wrote, in 1860, an analytical review of Lord Brougham's Law Reforms, in which he listed "no less than forty Statutes which he has initiated and carried through Parliament, besides upwards of fifty Bills introduced by him at various periods. Great portions of the latter have formed the basis of Legislation, and have been incorporated into other Acts", with others remaining unadopted at that time.

In 1855, he published A Tribute to Hydropathy, in which he recounts his own experience of health improvement via hydropathy at an establishment, including typical adjuncts such as exercise, "simplicity of diet", and the application of various hydrotherapeutic techniques. He also praised Captain R. T. Claridge "for his strenuous exertions in the cause", to which every hydropathist "owes a deep debt of gratitude". While Eardley-Wilmot's publications preceding and subsequent to this work were on the "comparatively dry subject of Law Amendment", he indulged in some word-play in his preface to the fifth edition of Tribute to Hydropathy, while at the same time driving home pertinent points.
The Second Edition of this little Watery Tablet having been long out of print, I have been requested to allow a Third Edition to swim to the press. I considered at first that so fragile a memorial would have sunk, when it had no longer the fact of Hydropathy being a novelty to buoy it up, and when Stansted-Bury, the scene of the liquid discipline described, became forsaken for more commodious baths, or for more favourite resorts. But my friends remind me that sickness belongs to no certain period of time and to no particular locality.

Nevertheless, his tribute to, and discussion of, hydropathy was in earnest. While acknowledging that some physicians of the day considered hydropathy to be a dangerous experiment by credulous people with a passing fad, until leaving room for "fresh fallacies, to deceive the unwary", Eardley-Wilmot disagreed. He thought the underlying principles would prove sound, and that a solid foundation, simplicity of theory, and effective outcomes would outlast criticisms.
Medicine, in truest acceptance of the word, is not the art of administering drugs, but the art of healing. He is the best physician as well as philosopher, who removes or assuages those evils to which the human frame is liable, with least violence done to Nature; and while he obviates the present inconvenience, endeavours, as far as lies in his power, to leave the vital powers unweakened, and undiminished by the remedies he applies.

In 1859, he wrote a memoir on Thomas Assheton Smith, a famous fox hunter in the early 19th century. In 1893, the year after Sir John E. Eardley-Wilmot died, his son, William Assheton Eardley-Wilmot, who was named after the subject of the memoir, published a fifth edition of it. In the preface to the fifth edition, W.A. Eardley-Wilmot wrote:
"The first edition appeared when I was a school boy at Old Charterhouse in the City, and I remember being sent to the office of the Sporting Magazine to copy out the verses on the celebrated Billesdon Coplow Run".

Marriage and issue
On 17 April 1839 he married Eliza Martha Williams (1813–1887) at Leamington Priors in Warwickshire. She was the daughter of Sir Robert Williams, 9th Baronet. With her, he had eight children:
 Selina Anne Mary Eardley-Wilmot (died 20 May 1922)
 William Assheton Eardley-Wilmot (16 May 1841 – 12 April 1896), succeeded to the baronetcy
 Revell Eardley-Wilmot (29 August 1842 – 14 June 1922), a major general in the British Army
 Edward Parry Eardley-Wilmot (23 December 1843 – 27 June 1898)
 Frederick Henry Eardley-Wilmot (3 March 1846 – 3 November 1873), lieutenant in the Royal Artillery. Killed in action during the Third Anglo-Ashanti War.
 Sydney Marow Eardley-Wilmot (3 October 1847 – 27 February 1929), later a rear admiral in the Royal Navy
 Hugh Eden Eardley-Wilmot (7 November 1850 – 10 March 1926)
 Emma A. E. Eardley-Wilmot (born  1851)

Published works as known
 Full text at Internet Archive (archive.org)
 Full text at Internet Archive (archive.org)
 Full text at Internet Archive (archive.org)
 Full text at Internet Archive (archive.org)
 Memoir to Thomas Assheton Smith (1776–1858). Preface to 5th edition by his son William Assheton Eardley-Wilmot, named after the book's subject.

Cricket
In 1840, when he was still known as John Wilmot, Eardley-Wilmot played in a first-class cricket match for Marylebone Cricket Club (MCC) and was dismissed for nought in his only innings.

Notes

a.  Here Eardley-Wilmot draws on his knowledge of Latin (as also in other works), with a footnote stating: "Lat. 'Medeor', to cure or heal".

References

External links 
 

1810 births
1892 deaths
Alumni of Balliol College, Oxford
Baronets in the Baronetage of the United Kingdom
19th-century English judges
Members of the Parliament of the United Kingdom for English constituencies
UK MPs 1874–1880
UK MPs 1880–1885
English cricketers of 1826 to 1863
Marylebone Cricket Club cricketers
John